Dan Laursen (born March 9, 1960) is an American politician and a Republican member of the Wyoming House of Representatives representing District 25 since January 5, 2015.

Elections

2014
Laursen challenged one-term incumbent David Blevins in the Republican primary. He defeated Blevins, 55% to 45%. Laursen was then elected unopposed in the general election.

2016
Laursen was challenged by former Representative David Blevins in the Republican primary. Laursen defeated Blevins with 58% of the vote. He faced Democrat Shane Tillotson in the general election and defeated Tillotson with 78.9% of the vote.

References

External links
Official page at the Wyoming Legislature
Profile from Ballotpedia

Living people
Republican Party members of the Wyoming House of Representatives
Politicians from Laramie, Wyoming
1960 births
21st-century American politicians
People from Powell, Wyoming